In geometry, a spherical segment is the solid defined by cutting a sphere or a ball with a pair of parallel planes.
It can be thought of as a spherical cap with the top truncated, and so it corresponds to a spherical frustum. 

The surface of the spherical segment (excluding the bases) is called spherical zone.

 

The curved surface area of the spherical zone—which excludes the top and bottom bases—is given by

See also 
 Spherical cap
 Spherical wedge
 Spherical sector

References

External links 

 
 
 Summary of spherical formulas

Spherical geometry